Runestone DR 120, MJy 51, known as Spentrup stone 2 and the Jennum stone, is a Viking Age runestone engraved with the Younger Futhark and a Thor's hammer.

Stone
The runestone was first mentioned by 18th-century scholar Søren Abildgaard, who wrote that it was found at the end of a stone bridge in the village of Jennum. It was lost for a long time until it was rediscovered in 1913, but by then it had been split into seven pieces. It was repaired and raised at the museum in the town of Randers. In the 1960s it was transferred to the new , during which it broke into 14 or 15 pieces; it has been restored.

The stone is granite, with a memorial inscription in the Younger Futhark in the RAK style, dated to 970-1020 or to 1000–1050. The top of the stone, including part of the inscription band, is missing.

The stone shows one of several pictorial representations of Thor's hammer, following the last punctuation mark (x) at the end of the inscription on the left; it resembles a cross or hammer on the front of the Karlevi Runestone, Öl 1. Other stones with Thor's hammer include DR 26, VG 113, Sö 86 and Sö 111.

Inscription

Transliteration of the runes into Latin characters
oskatla × risþi (×) -… …-ls × sbaka × sun × stin × ¶ þonsi × ⁓

Transcription into Old Norse
Askatla resþi … …[gi]sl, Spaka sun, sten þænsi.

Translation into English
Áskatla raised this stone … …-gísl, Spaki's son.

References

Sources
 

Runestones in Denmark
Danish Runic Inscriptions
11th-century inscriptions